Anahita is a genus of wandering spiders first described by Ferdinand Karsch in 1879.

Species
 it contains twenty-nine species, many from Africa and Asia:
Anahita aculeata (Simon, 1897) – West, Central Africa
Anahita blandini Benoit, 1977 – Ivory Coast
Anahita centralis Benoit, 1977 – Central Africa
Anahita concrassata Benoit, 1977 – Burundi
Anahita concreata Benoit, 1977 – Congo
Anahita concussor Benoit, 1977 – Congo
Anahita denticulata (Simon, 1884) – Myanmar, Indonesia (Simeulue)
Anahita faradjensis Lessert, 1929 – Congo
Anahita fauna Karsch, 1879 (type) – Russia (Far East), China, Korea, Japan
Anahita feae (F. O. Pickard-Cambridge, 1902) – Myanmar
Anahita jianfengensis Zhang, Hu & Han, 2011 – China
Anahita jinsi Jäger, 2012 – China
Anahita jucunda (Thorell, 1897) – Myanmar
Anahita lineata Simon, 1897 – Ivory Coast, Congo
Anahita lycosina (Simon, 1897) – West Africa
Anahita mamma Karsch, 1884 – West, Central, East Africa
Anahita maolan Zhu, Chen & Song, 1999 – China, Taiwan
Anahita nathani Strand, 1907 – Bahama Is.
Anahita pallida (L. Koch, 1875) – Egypt, Ethiopia
Anahita popa Jäger & Minn, 2015 – Myanmar
Anahita punctata (Thorell, 1890) – Indonesia (Sumatra)
Anahita punctulata (Hentz, 1844) – USA
Anahita pygmaea Benoit, 1977 – Ivory Coast
Anahita samplexa Yin, Tang & Gong, 2000 – China, Korea
Anahita similis Caporiacco, 1947 – Central, East Africa
Anahita smythiesi (Simon, 1897) – India
Anahita syriaca (O. Pickard-Cambridge, 1872) – Israel
Anahita wuyiensis Li, Jin & Zhang, 2014 – China
Anahita zoroides Schmidt & Krause, 1994 – Comoros

References

Ctenidae
Araneomorphae genera
Spiders of Asia
Spiders of Africa
Taxa named by Ferdinand Karsch